Connection Magazines is an Australian online and print publisher. Its core interest is the publication of trade and consumer-focused magazines and online media in the building and construction sector. Connection Magazines also incorporates a market research division (Connection Research) and an events division (Connection Events), through which annual Australian industry forums are conducted. Connection Magazines also engages in advocacy for the various industries it covers, and is a long-serving member of a variety of international trade organisations (such as the World Plumbing Council).

History 
Connection Magazines was originally called QUATSID Pty. Ltd., but also traded as Patchell Publishing Pty. Ltd. and Jeff Patchell Pty. Ltd. before adopting the name 'Connection Magazines' in the June 2000.

Trade publications 
The company was founded by Jeff Patchell in 1985 with the creation of Plumbing Connection magazine. The business has since expanded to include other trade magazine titles including Electrical Connection, Building Connection, Business Connection, Cabling Connection, Retail Connection, Connected Home Australia and Connected Home Middle East.

Consumer titles 
In 2008 Connection Magazines began its first consumer-based website with the launch of its Connected Home website. This was followed in 2010 by the launch of BUILD, an online building and renovation resource for the domestic Australian market. 2011 also saw the launch of the company's first consumer-focused magazine, Stunning Smart Homes, which was followed shortly thereafter by its second consumer magazine title ManSpace magazine.

References

External links 
 Connection Magazines
 BUILD.com.au
 Connected Home
 Electrical Connection
 Cabling Connection
 Plumbing Connection
 ManSpace Magazine Online

Magazine publishing companies of Australia
1985 establishments in Australia
Publishing companies established in 1985